Chilmary Union is a union parishad situated at Daulatpur Upazila,  in Kushtia District, Khulna Division of Bangladesh. There are 18 villages and 08 mouzas in the union.

References

External links
 

Unions of Khulna Division
Unions of Daulatpur Upazila, Kushtia
Unions of Kushtia District